Michael Grbevski (born 9 April 1967) is an Australian former soccer player. He played as a defender. He is currently head coach of Rockdale City Suns Under 20's.

Playing career

Club career
Grbevski played for St George, Sydney Croatia, Adelaide City and Wollongong Wolves in the National Soccer League before a stint with Rockdale Ilinden in the New South Wales State League.

International career
During 1992, Grbevski appeared three times for Australia in full internationals.

References

Australian soccer players
Australia international soccer players
1967 births
Sydney United 58 FC players
Living people
Australian people of Macedonian descent
Association football defenders